Black Moon may refer to:

 Black moon, one of four astronomical events involving new or dark moons
 Black Moon (person) (c. 1821–1893), Lakota (American Indian) headman
 Black Moon or Lilith (hypothetical moon), a hypothetical natural satellite of Earth

Music 
 Black Moon (group), a hip-hop group from Brooklyn
 Blackmoon, alias of Swedish metal guitarist David Parland
 Black Moon (album), a 1992 album by Emerson, Lake & Palmer, as well as its title track
 "Black Moon", a song by Black Sabbath from Headless Cross
 "Black Moon", a track on Deftones album B-Sides & Rarities
 "Black Moon", a song by The Lacs

Visual arts 
 Black Moon (1934 film), a 1934 film, starring Fay Wray
 Black Moon (1975 film), a surreal film from 1975, directed by Louis Malle
 Black Moon (car), a fictional car from the 1986 action film Black Moon Rising
 Black Moon Chronicles, a French fantasy comic book series
 Black Moon Clan, a group of villains in the Sailor Moon franchise